In 2022 NASCAR will sanction three national series:
2022 NASCAR Cup Series – the top racing series in NASCAR
2022 NASCAR Xfinity Series – the second-highest racing series in NASCAR
2022 NASCAR Camping World Truck Series – the third-highest racing series in NASCAR

 
NASCAR seasons